Mati Jostov (14 September 1958 in Põlva – 25 July 2005 in Mustvee Parish) was an Estonian economist and politician. He has been member of X Riigikogu.

He was a member of Estonian Centre Party.

References

1958 births
2005 deaths
20th-century Estonian economists
Estonian Centre Party politicians
Members of the Riigikogu, 2003–2007
Recipients of the Order of the White Star, 4th Class
Estonian University of Life Sciences alumni
People from Põlva
21st-century Estonian economists